Longin Rudasingwa is a Rwandan professional football manager.

Career
From 1995 until 2000 he coached the Rayon Sports F.C. In 1998, he became a head coach of the Rwanda national football team. After resignation Rudi Gutendorf in October 2000 he again worked as manager of the Rwanda team.

Honours
Rwandan Premier League: 2
 1997, 1998

Rwandan Cup: 2
 1995, 1998

CECAFA Clubs Cup: 1
1998

References

Year of birth missing (living people)
Living people
Rwandan football managers
Rwanda national football team managers
Place of birth missing (living people)